Earl W. Warren (February 25, 1902 – May 3, 1972) was an American politician from Wisconsin. A member of the Democratic Party, Warren served in the State Assembly.from 1954 to 1970.

Early life and career
Warren was born on February 25, 1902, in Hurley, Wisconsin. He went on to work at the Young Radiator Company as an assembler.

Political career
From 1948 to 1955, he was a member of the Racine County, Wisconsin Board. In 1954, he was elected to the Wisconsin State Assembly, and left office in 1970.

Death and legacy 
Warren died in his home on May 3, 1972, at the age of 70.

References

People from Hurley, Wisconsin
People from Racine County, Wisconsin
County supervisors in Wisconsin
1902 births
1972 deaths
20th-century American politicians
Democratic Party members of the Wisconsin State Assembly